Ruslan Anatolevich Kapantsow ((Ruslan Kopantsov); born 12 May 1981) is a Belarusian professional footballer who plays for Gorki.

Honours
Dinamo Minsk
Belarusian Cup winner: 2002–03

Shakhtyor Soligorsk
Belarusian Cup winner: 2013–14

External links

1981 births
Living people
People from Mogilev
Sportspeople from Mogilev Region
Belarusian footballers
Association football goalkeepers
FC Veino players
FC Dnepr Mogilev players
FC Dinamo Minsk players
FC Belshina Bobruisk players
FC Volna Pinsk players
FC Shakhtyor Soligorsk players
FC Gorki players